Sir George Norman Clark,  (27 February 1890 – 6 February 1979) was an English historian, academic and British Army officer. He was the Chichele Professor of Economic History at the University of Oxford from 1931 to 1943 and the Regius Professor of Modern History at The University of Cambridge from 1943 to 1947. He served as Provost of Oriel College, Oxford, from 1947 to 1957.

Early life
Clark was born on 27 February 1890 in Halifax, Yorkshire, England, to James Walker Clark and his wife Mary Clark (née Midgley). He was educated at Bootham School, a private boarding school in York, and at Manchester Grammar School, a Grammar School in Manchester.

In 1908, he matriculated into Balliol College, Oxford to study classics as a Brackenbury Scholar. In 1911, he achieved a first class in Literae Humaniores. He then changed to modern history and graduated in 1912 with a first class honours Bachelor of Arts (BA) degree. In 1912, he was elected to a prize fellowship at All Souls College, Oxford and spent time abroad learning foreign languages.

Career

Military service
Clark had been a member of the Officers' Training Corps attached to the University of Oxford during his studies. On 26 August 1914, he was commissioned into the Post Office Rifles, British Army, as a second lieutenant. On 27 May 1915, he was promoted to lieutenant. During the early part of World War I, he was wounded twice.

In May 1916, while fighting in the Battle of Vimy Ridge, he was taken prisoner by the Germans. At the time of his capture, he held the rank of captain. He was held in Gütersloh and Krefeld, and spent his time learning languages. He was also involved in writing plays for fellow prisoners to perform, one of which was performed postwar at the Haymarket Theatre, London. He was released at the end of hostilities and returned to Britain.

Academic career
Having been elected a Fellow of All Souls College, Oxford, in 1912, Clark's academic career truly started in 1919 when he was elected a Fellow and lecturer of Oriel College, Oxford.

He became the inaugural Chichele Professor of Economic History at the University of Oxford in 1931 (with the accompanying Fellowship at All Souls), a post he held until 1943. From then until 1947 he was Regius Professor of Modern History at Cambridge University and a fellow of Trinity College, Cambridge. Between 1947 and 1957, he was Provost of Oriel College, Oxford.

Clark wrote a general introduction to the second edition of the Cambridge Modern History (1957), criticising the belief of some historians (in particular Lord Acton who had edited the first edition over half a century earlier) that eventually it would be possible to write an "ultimate history", rather they should expect their works to be built on and superseded by later historians. He stated that "knowledge of the past has come down through one or more human minds, has been processed by them, and therefore cannot consist of elemental and impersonal atoms which nothing can alter..."

Between the 1930s and 1960s, Clark was the editor overseeing the Oxford History of England series and wrote Volume X: The Later Stuarts, 1660–1714 (1934), which was the first of the series to be published. His The Seventeenth Century appeared in 1929, and he wrote numerous other monographs.  He was twice editor of the English Historical Review.

He delivered the Wiles Lectures in the Queen's University of Belfast in October 1956. They were published as War and Society in the Seventeenth Century (Cambridge UP, 1958).

Honours
He was knighted in the 1953 Coronation Honours List.  Clark was elected Fellow of the British Academy (FBA) in 1936. He was a Foreign Member of the American Academy of Arts and Sciences. In 1953 he was elected an honorary fellow of Trinity College Dublin.

References

External links
 
 
 

1890 births
1979 deaths
Military personnel from Yorkshire
British Army personnel of World War I
London Regiment officers
British World War I prisoners of war
Alumni of Balliol College, Oxford
Fellows of All Souls College, Oxford
Fellows of Trinity College, Cambridge
Economic historians
People educated at Manchester Grammar School
Chichele Professors of Economic History
Historians of England
Honorary Fellows of Trinity College Dublin
Presidents of the British Academy
Provosts of Oriel College, Oxford
People educated at Bootham School
Members of the University of Cambridge faculty of history
Fellows of the British Academy
Knights Bachelor
World War I prisoners of war held by Germany
British male dramatists and playwrights
20th-century British dramatists and playwrights
20th-century English historians
20th-century English male writers
Regius Professors of History (Cambridge)